6 Paoni - Coptic calendar - 8 Paoni

Fixed commemorations
All fixed commemorations below are observed on 7 Paoni (14 June) by the Coptic Orthodox Church.

Saints
Martyrdom of Saint Abaskhiron the Soldier

References
Coptic Synexarion

Days of the Coptic calendar